Sipho Percevale Mbule (born 22 March 1998) is a South African soccer player who plays as a central midfielder for South African Premier Division side Mamelodi Sundowns.

Mbule was born in Bethlehem in the province of Free State. He started his youth career at Harmony Sports Academy in 2013, alongside Teboho Mokoena, before joining SuperSport United's academy. He made his senior debut for SuperSport United in August 2017.

Mbule has trained with the South Africa national under-17 team, and has represented the South Africa under-20, under-23 and senior international teams.

References

External links
 

Living people
1998 births
South African soccer players
People from Bethlehem, Free State
Association football midfielders
SuperSport United F.C. players
Mamelodi Sundowns F.C. players
South African Premier Division players
South Africa international soccer players
South Africa youth international soccer players
South Africa under-20 international soccer players
Soccer players from the Free State (province)